The Primrose Club was a short-lived political London gentlemen's club founded in 1886 and located at 4-5 Park Place, St. James's. It was aligned to the Conservative party, with members having to pledge support. It was launched as a bid to combine the explosion of the popularity of clubs in London at the end of the nineteenth century with the phenomenal success of the Conservative-aligned Primrose League.

At first it proved highly successful, with Whitaker's Almanack reporting 6,500 members, but within a decade this had already shrunk to 5,500, and by 1910 it had just 350 members, and was disbanded shortly afterwards.

Notes

See also
List of London's gentlemen's clubs

Gentlemen's clubs in London
1886 establishments in the United Kingdom
Organizations established in 1886
History of the Conservative Party (UK)